De Meer Stadion is the former stadium of Dutch record football champions Ajax. It was opened in 1934 as a result of the club's former stadium being too small. Upon completion, it could hold 22,000 spectators, but accommodating up to 29,500 at its maximum. At time of the closure in 1996 it could hold 19,500 spectators.

Over time, as Ajax's popularity and success grew, the De Meer proved to be too small.  From 1930 onward, Ajax played their big (European) games at the Olympic Stadium.  The larger venue also hosted Ajax's midweek night games, since the De Meer Stadion was not suited for floodlights until the mid-seventies.

The De Meer was abandoned with the opening of the purpose-built Amsterdam Arena in 1996, which since 2018 is called the Johan Cruyff Arena.

The Netherlands national football team played five international matches at the stadium, winning all of them. The first one, on August 22, 1973, was a qualifying match for the 1974 FIFA World Cup against Iceland (5-0). The last one, played on 25 March 1992, was a friendly against Yugoslavia (2-0).

The final match at De Meer was an Eredivisie game in which Ajax hosted Willem II on 28 April 1996. The home side won 5–1 with Finidi George scoring a hat trick, but the final ever goal in the stadium was scored by Willem II striker Jack de Gier.

Following the club's departure, the De Meer was demolished to make way for a housing development. However, the area is commemorated by having the new streets named after famous football stadia from around the world. The centrespot was recreated cosmetically as the real centrespot was built over.

References

External links
  VoetbalStats
 english.ajax.nl - De Meer

Architecture in the Netherlands
Defunct football venues in the Netherlands
De Meer
Sports venues in Amsterdam
Amsterdam-Oost
Sports venues completed in 1934
Sports venues demolished in 1998
Articles containing video clips
Defunct sports venues in the Netherlands
Demolished buildings and structures in the Netherlands
1934 establishments in the Netherlands
20th-century architecture in the Netherlands